Cheongju Polytechnic College is a vocational college located in Cheongju City, the capital of North Chungcheong province, South Korea.  The current president is Kwon-hyun Lee.  The student body numbers about 760, and the teaching staff about 29.

Academics

The school's academics are divided among six departments:  Computer Aided Machinery, Mechatronics, Automation Systems, Electricity, Electronics, and Information & Communications Systems.

See also
Education in South Korea
List of colleges and universities in South Korea

External links
 Official school website, in English and Korean

Vocational education in South Korea
Universities and colleges in North Chungcheong Province
Korea Polytechnics
Cheongju

ko:한국폴리텍4대학